Eesa is a 2009 Indian Tamil language action drama film directed by Bala Ganesha. The film stars Vignesh and Lakshana, with Thoothukudi M. Rajendran, Singampuli, M. S. Bhaskar and Lollu Sabha Manohar playing supporting roles. The film, produced by J. Jayakrishnan, was released on 7 August 2009.

Plot
The film begins with the young man Sudaleeswaran aka Eesa (Vignesh) killing a salt pan owner in a remote village in Thoothukudi. Eesa lives in a small hut with his wife Selvi (Lakshana). He then continues to kill a couple of salt pan owners and bumps them off in his hut.

Thanga Malai Annachi (Thoothukudi M. Rajendran) is the local bigwig and the owner of a salt pan in which Eesa works. Upset to see his partners and friends killed by a mysterious person, Thanga Malai Annachi starts to kill all his enemies. He then finds out that the killer is none other than Eesa, so he sends the police to catch him. The police discovers multiple corpses in Eesa's hut, including Selvi's. It is revealed that Eesa lives in a world of his own and believes that Selvi, who was killed a few months back, is still alive. He keeps her body in his hut and kills the murderers.

A few months back, Eesa, who spent most of the time with his friend Kadukkai (Singampuli), fell in love with Selvi. Selvi accepted his love, and they got married. She later became pregnant. One day, Selvi saw Thanga Malai Annachi and his gang brutally murdering a government official and his wife. Selvi questioned them, resulting in her brutal murder. Eesa, who was working in the salt pan, heard a cry of pain and discovered his wife in blood. Eesa tried to save her, but she died in his arms.

The rest of the story is how Eesa killed Thanga Malai Annachi.

Cast

Vignesh as Sudaleeswaran aka Eesa
Lakshana as Selvi
Thoothukudi M. Rajendran as Thanga Malai Annachi
Singampuli as Kadukkai
M. S. Bhaskar as Duraisamy
Lollu Sabha Manohar as Karuthapandi
Madurai Saroja as Selvi's aunt
V. B. D. Prasad as Annachi
P. Arun as Annachi
E. K. Venkatesh as Annachi
Muthukaalai
Rajini Nivetha
Subburaj
Asha
Nikisha
Ramdoss as Fisherman (uncredited)

Production

The producer signed Vignesh and Lakshana to play the lead roles in the film. Actors M. S. Bhaskar, Lollu Sabha Manohar, and Muthukalai also joined the cast to take charge of the comedy sequences. The stunt scenes have been handled by stunt master Dragon Chingli. Eesa has been shot extensively in Courtallam, Vasudevanallur and Aranthangi.

Soundtrack

The film score and the soundtrack were composed by Haran. The soundtrack, released in 2009, features 5 tracks with lyrics written by Na. Muthukumar, Yugabharathi and Madurakavi. The audio was launched at Kamaraj Hall, alongside special guests A. R. Rahman, Thangar Bachan, Jiiva and Karan. Superstar Rajinikanth sent a letter wishing the team well, which was read out by Haran's father Sridhar.

Reception

Box office
The film opened in a few centres across Chennai, Tamil Nadu to an average opening.

Critical reception
The film opened to mixed to negative reviews from critics with Lakshana's performance receiving unanimous praise from film critics.

Indiaglitz.com wrote, "Eesa by JK Creations is a movie that manages to sustain interest for it is old wine but rendered in a new bottle". Sify labelled the film as average and went on to praise "the locations and the climax action scenes". Nowrunning.com gave 1 star out of 5 and described the film as clichéd and far from convincing. Behindwoods.com gave the film 0.5 stars out of 5 and stated, "Eesa is a poorly made film with the shoddy script being the main culprit". Deccanherald.com wrote, "despite creditable performances, Eesa leaves you with a rather unpleasant feeling".

References

2009 films
2000s Tamil-language films
Indian action drama films
Films shot in Thoothukudi
2009 directorial debut films
2009 action drama films